Olaus Jair Skarsem (born 2 July 1998) is a Norwegian footballer who plays for Rosenborg.

Career

He made his debut for Rosenborg 13 April 2016 against Åfjord FK in the first round of the Cup, coming on and scoring in a 3-0 away win.

After struggelig with injuries in the 2017 and 2018 season, also playing time when fit, he was sent out on loan to Ranheim for the 2019 season. He made his Eliteserien debut for Ranheim coming on against Tromsø in a 1-2 loss at home in the first round of the 2019 season. He scored his first league goal against Sarpsborg 08 on May 19 in a 3-1 away win. On 14 January 2020 Skarsem signed for Kristiansund. In July 2021 Skarsem returned to Rosenborg.

Career statistics

Club

1 Includes Norwegian Super Cup matches.

References

1998 births
Living people
People from Melhus
Norwegian footballers
Norway youth international footballers
Rosenborg BK players
Ranheim Fotball players
Kristiansund BK players
Eliteserien players
Association football midfielders
Sportspeople from Trøndelag